William Lawrence Baillieu (29 April 1859 – 6 February 1936) was an Australian financier and politician. He was a successful businessman, having developed significant business interests from his relatively humble beginnings. He associated with many of the most influential people of his era, and served in the Victorian Legislative Council for 21 years, including stints as Minister for Works and Health and leader of the Legislative Council. As such, he began the Baillieu family dynasty, several members of which remain prominent figures in public life today.

Life and politics

Baillieu was born in Queenscliff, Victoria in 1859. He was the second son of James George Baillieu and his wife Emma Lawrence, née Pow, relatively recent immigrants. He was educated at the local state school. He began working as an office boy in the Bank of Victoria at the age of fifteen, and remained with the bank for eleven years. In 1885, he went into partnership with J.D. Munro as auctioneers and estate agents.

Two years later, he married Bertha Latham, with whom he would later have three sons and four daughters. The partnership with Munro broke up in 1892 and Baillieu founded his own business as an auctioneer, land agent and finance broker. He made and lost a fortune in the Victorian land boom of the 1890s, but was able to avoid bankruptcy due to a little-known loophole in the insolvency law of the time which was exploited by his solicitor, Theodor Fink. As a result of the loophole, Baillieu was able to clear his debts by paying only a tiny fraction of the sum owed, and was able to escape the stigma of bankruptcy. Despite this hitch, he had developed a reputation as an able and competent financier, and became a director of the Herald & Weekly Times around the turn of the century.

In 1901, Baillieu entered politics, standing for and being elected to the Victorian Legislative Council as the member for Northern Province. He was a backbencher for several years, but was promoted to the ministry with the ascension of John Murray as premier, serving as Minister of Public Works and Health. He also served as leader of the Legislative Council until 1917. Baillieu served as an honorary minister in the Murray, Watt and Peacock governments before retiring from politics altogether in 1922.

Towards the end of his political career, Baillieu began to take advantage of the need for lead and zinc that had been made clear as a result of World War I. Following up on his involvement in the 1905 founding of Zinc Corporation Ltd. at the Broken Hill Ore Deposit in New South Wales, Baillieu worked with W.S. Robinson and Sir Colin Fraser to reorganise the Broken Hill Associated Smelters at Port Pirie and brought about the formation and development of EZ Industries in Risdon, Tasmania. As a result of this work, he was awarded (jointly with Robinson) the gold medal of the Institution of Mining and Metallurgy. At the time of his retirement in 1930, Baillieu was a director of the Herald & Weekly Times, EZ Industries, the Dunlop Rubber Company and Carlton & United Breweries. He was also involved with the prestigious Victoria Golf Club, which he had founded and served as president of for several years.

Baillieu died in London, England on 6 February 1936. His own estate at his death was sworn at only sixty-thousand pounds (Australian) although he was reputed to be a millionaire. However, he had made substantial contributions to charity; among other things, he founded the Anzac Hostel in Brighton, Victoria as a home for permanently disabled ex-soldiers. His descendants have become part of one of Melbourne's wealthiest and most prominent families.

References
Information sourced from obituaries in The Times (London), 7 February 1936 and The Argus, Melbourne, 7 and 8 February 1936; Cyclopaedia of Victoria, 1903, Who's Who in Australia, 1938 edn.
J. R. Poynter, 'Baillieu, William Lawrence (1859–1936)', Australian Dictionary of Biography, Volume 7, MUP, 1979, pp 138–145.

Further reading

1859 births
1936 deaths
Australian pastoralists
Australian auctioneers
Politicians from Melbourne
Victoria (Australia) state politicians
Members of the Victorian Legislative Council
Australian people of Belgian descent
People of Walloon descent
Businesspeople from Melbourne